Arturo Di Mezza (born 16 July 1969) is a former Italian race walker who was 4th in the 50 km walk at the 1996 Summer Olympics.

Career
In his career he has participated in four editions of the world championships, two Olympics and as many European championships. In these 8 occasions he has reached the top eight 5 times.

Since 1984 to 1993 was trained by  Vincenzo Rossi in Naples and since 1993 to 2000 was trained in Saluzzo by Sandro Damilano, brother of Maurizio and Giorgio Damilano.

Achievements

See also
 Italian all-time lists - 50 km walk
 Italian team at the running events
 Italy at the IAAF World Race Walking Cup
 Italy at the European Race Walking Cup

References

External links
 

1969 births
Living people
Italian male racewalkers
Athletes (track and field) at the 1996 Summer Olympics
Athletes (track and field) at the 2000 Summer Olympics
Olympic athletes of Italy
Universiade medalists in athletics (track and field)
World Athletics Championships athletes for Italy
Universiade bronze medalists for Italy
Medalists at the 1991 Summer Universiade
Medalists at the 1995 Summer Universiade
Medalists at the 1997 Summer Universiade
Athletics competitors of Fiamme Gialle
20th-century Italian people